Marina Canetti (born January 24, 1983 in Rio de Janeiro) is a female water polo player from Brazil, who won the bronze medal with the Brazil women's national water polo team at the 2003 Pan American Games. She also competed at the 2007 Pan American Games, finishing in fourth place, and the 2011 World Aquatics Championships.

References

External links
  Profile

1983 births
Living people
Brazilian female water polo players
Water polo players from Rio de Janeiro (city)
Water polo players at the 2007 Pan American Games
Water polo players at the 2011 Pan American Games
Pan American Games bronze medalists for Brazil
Olympic water polo players of Brazil
Water polo players at the 2016 Summer Olympics
Pan American Games medalists in water polo
Water polo players at the 2015 Pan American Games
Medalists at the 2011 Pan American Games
Medalists at the 2015 Pan American Games
Ethnikos Piraeus Water Polo Club players
21st-century Brazilian women